LG Mini GD880i is a multimedia feature phone released by LG Electronics in April 2010. The Mini is very similar feature wise to the LG KM900 Arena with exception to the display and internal memory.

The LG Mini is a metallic cased phone with a black face plate and a silver metallic bar running across the top with the video call camera and earpiece. There are no keys on the front of the phone. On the top there is a 3.5mm stereo audio jack, microUSB port and a power/lock/unlock key. On the right there is a single volume rocker and on the left there is the microSD card slot under a metal sliding cover and a camera key at the bottom. The back is black plastic with the camera at the top and an LG logo at the bottom.

Multimedia
DivX, XviD, MPEG4 and H.264 playback up to 800x480 resolution with AAC Stereo soundtrack in an MP4 container or MP3 (Stereo)/AC3 (5.1 Surround) Soundtrack in an AVI container. (Recommended Settings: H.264 Baseline Profile 800x448 @ 2.5 Mbit/s with AAC Stereo/Dolby ProLogic II @ 160 kbit/s in MP4) The video player supports Dolby Mobile audio enhancement.
Records in MPEG4 up to VGA resolution.
5-megapixel (2560 x 1920 pixels) autofocus main camera.
Music Player plays .mp3,.m4a,.aac and .wma files. The music player also features the Dolby Mobile sound enhancement

Social Networking and Connectivity
The Mini supports Facebook and Twitter through separate widgets and 2 separate icons in the main menu.
The device features WiFi and 3G/HSPA network support.
The LG Air Sync service is available on the phone with syncing of various features through the internet and changing the phone's wallpaper through a program installed on your computer.
There is an A-GPS receiver built into the phone with Google Maps installed in the phone to access it and provide navigation options

References

red my review about lg gdmini 880 here

Mobile phones introduced in 2010
GD880 Mini